John W. Schaum (January 27, 1905, Milwaukee, Wisconsin - July 18, 1988, Milwaukee) was an American pianist, composer, and educator.

Education
Schaum received a Bachelor of Music degree from Marquette University in 1931, a Bachelor of Music Education degree from University of Wisconsin–Milwaukee, and a Master of Music degree from Northwestern University in 1934.

Career
Schaum began his career as a piano teacher in the late 1920s. In 1933 he founded the Schaum Piano School in Milwaukee. About the same time he began to compose piano music for teaching purposes. He also founded the first company to produce award stickers specifically for music students. Always on the lookout for better materials for his students, Schaum eventually decided to create his own books, beginning in 1941 with Piano Fun for Boys and Girls, which he later revised as the first in a series of nine piano method books that became the Schaum Piano Course, completed in 1945. These books are still widely used today.

Over the course of his career, Schaum wrote many more books and hundreds of pieces of sheet music. His arrangement of the Marines' Hymn, issued during World War II, sold more than a million copies. Though he received only a fixed fee of $15 for this work, its success attracted the attention of Belwin Publications, for whom he went on to produce more than a hundred sheet music arrangements.

Bibliography

John W. Schaum Piano Course: Leading to Mastery of the Instrument 
John W. Schaum Piano Course: Book Pre A - The Green Book (1945)
John W. Schaum Piano Course: Book A - The Red Book (1945)
John W. Schaum Piano Course: Book B - The Blue Book (1945)
John W. Schaum Piano Course: Book C - The Purple Book (1945)
John W. Schaum Piano Course: Book D - The Orange Book (1945)
John W. Schaum Piano Course: Book E - The Violet Book (1945)
John W. Schaum Piano Course: Book F - The Brown Book (1945)
John W. Schaum Piano Course: Book G - The Grey Book (1945)

Schaum Making Music Piano Library 

Making Music at the Piano: Book 1 (1962)
Making Music at the Piano: Book 2 (1963)
Making Music at the Piano: Book 3 (1963)
Making Music at the Piano: Book 4 (1963)
Making Music at the Piano: Book 5 (1964)
Making Music at the Piano: Book 6 (1964)
Making Music at the Piano: Book 7 (1964)

Arrangements 

Festival Fugue by J.S. Bach (1946)

Sing-along, play-along Christmas Songs and Tunes for Piano and Other Keyboard Instruments arranged and edited by John W. Schaum (1959)

The Waltz Book: Solo Piano Albums for the Young Student (1955)

References
 Aryeh Oron: Baker’s Biographical Dictionary of 20th Century Classical Musicians, 1997
  Paul E. Bierley, William H. Rehrig: The heritage encyclopedia of band music : composers and their music, Westerville, Ohio: Integrity Press, 1991, 
 Obituary index : 1988 obituary index, Notes (Music Library Association), 1989, p. 723
 E. Ruth Anderson: Contemporary American composers - A biographical dictionary, Second edition, Boston: G. K. Hall, 1982, 578 p., 
 Jaques Cattell Press: ASCAP biographical dictionary of composers, authors and publishers, Fourth edition, New York: R. R. Bowker, 1980, 589 p., 
 Paul Frank, Burchard Bulling, Florian Noetzel, Helmut Rosner: Kurzgefasstes Tonkünstler Lexikon - Zweiter Teil: Ergänzungen und Erweiterungen seit 1937, 15. Aufl., Wilhelmshaven: Heinrichshofen, Band 1: A-K. 1974. ; Band 2: L-Z. 1976. 
 Dr. J.T.H. Mize: The international who is who in music'', Fifth (Mid-Century) Edition, Chicago: Who is Who in Music, 1951, 576 p.

External links
Schaum, Wesley, Music Notes Vol. 16 No. 7 (July 2008), Schaum Publications.
 Schaum Publications website.

Marquette University alumni
University of Wisconsin–Milwaukee alumni
Bienen School of Music alumni
Musicians from Milwaukee
Educators from Wisconsin
Writers from Milwaukee
1905 births
1988 deaths
20th-century American musicians